The 1955 Sun Bowl was a college football postseason bowl game that featured the Texas Western Miners and the Florida State Seminoles.

Background
The Miners finished 3rd in the Border Intercollegiate Athletic Association in their second straight Sun Bowl, and fourth Sun Bowl in six years. As for the Seminoles, a 3–3 start ended with 5 straight wins to close out the regular season. This was their first Bowl since the 1950 Cigar Bowl.

Game summary
Harry Massey scored on a 1-yard touchdown run to give the Seminoles an early 7–0 lead, set up by a 25-yard kickoff return and a 48-yard rush both by Lee Corso. After Florida State lost both Corso (on a collision) and the ball after an ensuing punt, the Miners took advantage, scoring on a Rusty Rutledge touchdown catch from Jesse Whittenton to make it 7–7 after one quarter. In the second, the Miners exploded for 27 points. Whittenton ran for a touchdown run from 7 yards out to make it 13–7. Bob Forrest scored on a 45-yard touchdown run to make it 20–7. Whittenton threw his 2nd touchdown pass to make it 27–7. He then threw a pass to Rutledge from 16 yards out to make it 34–7 at halftime. Forrest scored once again to make it 41–7 Miners. The Seminoles finally responded with a Len Swantic touchdown pass to make it 41–13 (after the kick was blocked). Whittenton made it 47–13 on his 2-yard touchdown plunge. In the fourth quarter, the only score was on a Larry Massey touchdown pass to make it 47–20. Future actor Burt Reynolds rushed for 35 yards on 7 carries for Florida State. Whittenton went 7 of 13 for 138 yards and three touchdowns passing and two touchdowns on 13 yards (on 8 carries) rushing in an MVP effort.

Scoring Summary
 1st - Florida State - Massey 1-yard run (Graham kick)
 1st - Texas Western - Rutledge 56-yard pass from Whittenton (Whittenton kick)
 2nd - Texas Western - Whittenton 7-yard run (kick failed)
 2nd - Texas Western - B. Forrest 45-yard run (Whittenton kick)
 2nd - Texas Western - D. Forrest 19-yard pass from Whittenton (Whittenton kick)
 2nd - Texas Western - Rutledge 16-yard pass from Whittenton (Whittenton kick)
 3rd - Texas Western - B. Forrest 11-yard run (Whittenton kick)
 3rd - Florida State - Feamster 45-yard pass from Swantic (kick blocked)
 3rd - Texas Western - Whittenton 2-yard run (kick failed)
 4th - Florida State - Odom 16-yard pass from Massey (Graham kick)

Aftermath
The Miners went to the Sun Bowl thrice more in the next 12 years. As for Florida State, they returned once in 1966.

Statistics

References

Sun Bowl
Sun Bowl
Florida State Seminoles football bowl games
UTEP Miners football bowl games
1955 in sports in Texas
January 1955 sports events in the United States